Miko is a surname. Notable people with this surname include:
Izabella Miko (Izabella Anna Mikołajczak), Polish actress, dancer, producer, and environmental activist
József Mikó, Hungarian cinematographer
Ladislav Miko, Czech environmental expert and politician
William Miko, Zambian artist

See also

Mito (name)